Unconditional Love is the forty-seventh album by American singer/guitarist Glen Campbell, released in 1991 (see 1991 in music). The title track "Unconditional Love" was the first single, reaching No. 27 on the Hot Country Singles chart, while "Living in a House Full of Love" was the second single. The album itself did not chart in the US, but did chart briefly in New Zealand reaching No. 48.

The song "Somebody's Doin' Me Right" was also recorded by Keith Whitley and released posthumously as a single in 1992 from his album Kentucky Bluebird.

Track listing
 "Unconditional Love" (Donny Lowery, Randy Sharp, Tim DuBois) – 3:18
 "We Will" (Tony Haselden, Stan Munsey) – 3:06
 "Right Down to the Memories" (Steve Bogard, Rick Giles) – 3:06
 "Livin' in a House Full of Love" (Glenn Sutton, Billy Sherrill) – 2:20
 "Healing Hands of Time" (Willie Nelson) – 2:39
 "Next to You" (Lowery, Sharp) – 2:58
 "Somebody's Doin' Me Right" (J. Fred Knobloch, Paul Overstreet, Dan Tyler) – 3:09
 "I'm Gone This Time" (Carl Jackson) – 2:22
 "Once a Day" (Bill Anderson) – 2:34
 "Light of a Clear Blue Morning" (Dolly Parton) – 3:00

Personnel
Glen Campbell – lead vocals, acoustic guitar, electric guitar, background vocals
Larry Byrom – acoustic guitar, electric guitar
Brent Rowan – electric guitar
Reggie Young – electric guitar
Carl Jackson – electric guitar
Patrick Flynn – acoustic guitar
Michael Rhodes – bass guitar
Paul Franklin – steel guitar
Larry Knechtel – piano, synthesizer
Dave Innis – synthesizer
Hargus "Pig" Robbins – piano
Rob Hajacos – fiddle
James Stroud – drums
Wayland Patton, Curtis Young, John Cowan, Dennis Wilson, Louis Nunley, Donna McElroy, Carol Chase – background vocals

Production
Producers – Jimmy Bowen and Jerry Crutchfield
Engineers – John Guess, Marty Williams
Overdubs – Bob Bullock, Mark Coddington, Tim Kish, Tom Perry
Remix engineers – Tom Perry, David Boyer
Song selection – Ray Pillow
CD master tape prepared by Glenn Meadows at Masterfonics

Charts
Singles – Billboard (United States)

References

External links

Unconditional Love (album)
Unconditional Love (album)
Unconditional Love (album)
Albums produced by Jimmy Bowen
Albums produced by Jerry Crutchfield